Eccleshill may refer to the following places in England:

Eccleshill, Lancashire
Eccleshill, West Yorkshire
Eccleshill railway station